Ilya Aleksandrovich Kuzmichyov (born 10 January 1988) is a Russian professional football player.

Club career
He made his Russian Football National League debut for FC Khimik Dzerzhinsk on 6 July 2014 in a game against PFC Krylia Sovetov Samara.

External links
 
 
 

1988 births
Footballers from Saint Petersburg
Living people
Russian footballers
Association football forwards
FC Tosno players
FC Khimki players
FC Tom Tomsk players
FC Baltika Kaliningrad players
FC Khimik Dzerzhinsk players
FC SKA-Khabarovsk players
FC Spartak Kostroma players
FC Dynamo Stavropol players
FC Leningradets Leningrad Oblast players
FC Dynamo Saint Petersburg players